"The River of Dreams" is a song by American musician Billy Joel. It is the title track and first single from his 1993 album, River of Dreams. The song was a hit, peaking at number three on the US and UK charts, making it Joel's best-charting single of the decade as well as his final top ten in either country to date. It also hit the top spot in Australia, New Zealand, and on the Canadian and US Adult Contemporary charts. The song was produced by Joe Nicolo and Danny Kortchmar.

At least four versions of the song have been recorded and released. Two versions (released years later) include a bridge section containing a piano interlude paralleling Joel's melody from his song "Lullabye (Goodnight My Angel)," which is from the same album. These versions can be found on the boxed sets My Lives and Complete Hits Collection: 1973–1999 – but even these versions differ from each other, both in length and in arrangement: one, for instance, has more percussion. A fourth mix appears as a bonus cut on the UK CD single of "River of Dreams" — the "percapella mix" done by Nicolo.

"The River of Dreams" was nominated for the Grammy Award for Record of the Year in 1994, but lost out to "I Will Always Love You" by Whitney Houston. Joel performed the song at the ceremony, and abruptly stopped in the middle of his performance in order to verbally protest Frank Sinatra's lifetime achievement speech being cut off earlier in the night.

In 1993, Gary Zimmerman, a songwriter from Long Island, New York, attempted to sue Joel for ten million dollars, claiming more than half of "The River of Dreams" was based on his 1986 song "Nowhere Land." Joel said he had no knowledge of Zimmerman or his music, and Zimmerman dropped the lawsuit in 1994.

Production
The song borrows from the traditions of black gospel music and spirituals. The production includes a gospel choir and the lyrics deal with inner peace and the afterlife. Joel sings "Not sure about a life after this.  God knows I've never been a spiritual man," while stating that at night he walks along "The River of Dreams" so he can "find what he's been looking for." At 3 minutes 45 seconds, Joel can be heard singing The Cadillacs' version of "Gloria" as the music fades out.

Critical reception
Pan-European magazine Music & Media wrote, "Two ancient vocal genres meet each other in a modern rhythmic context, when Joel's doowop falsetto gets wrapped up in the sound of gospel backup singers." Alan Jones from Music Week gave the song three out of five, describing it as "a simple and immediate song wherein his vocals are echoed by a choir who imbue the song with spiritual qualities." He added, "A lot of fun, highly infectious and a hit."

Music video
The music video for the song was directed by Andy Morahan. The ferry featured is the Rocky Hill – Glastonbury Ferry in Connecticut. The video was shot on the Providence & Worcester railroad bridge spanning the Connecticut River in the city of Middletown, Connecticut.  Joel and three backup singers appear throughout the video standing on the western span of the bridge, with the open center section of the bridge behind them.  Other locations that were filmed in the music video are near Portland, East Haddam, and Old Saybrook, Connecticut. The scenes inside the tobacco barn with Joel on the piano were filmed inside a still-used tobacco barn in South Glastonbury, Connecticut.

Joel's then-wife Christie Brinkley can be seen painting the artwork that features on the front cover of the album River of Dreams. She is the illustrator who painted the actual album artwork, and each single released from the album featured one part of the large painting as cover art.

Track listings
All songs were written by Billy Joel.

 UK CD single
 "The River of Dreams"
 "The River of Dreams" (Percapella mix)
 "The Great Wall of China"

 Japanese mini-CD single
 "The River of Dreams" – 4:07
 "No Man's Land" – 4:49

Personnel
 Billy Joel – lead vocals, piano, Hammond organ, synthesizer
 Zachary Alford – drums
 Lewis Del Gatto – orchestra manager
 Lonnie Hillyer – bass
 Jeff Jacobs – additional programming
 Jeff Lee Johnson – bass
 Danny Kortchmar – guitar
 Andy Kravitz – percussion
 Ira Newborn – orchestration
 Wrecia Ford, Marlon Saunders, Frank Simms, George Simms, B. David Witworth – background vocals
 Crystal Taliefero – vocal arrangement, background vocals
 Chuck Treece – bass
 Mike Tyler – guitar

Charts

Weekly charts

Year-end charts

Certifications

References

External links
  

1992 songs
1993 singles
Billy Joel songs
Columbia Records singles
Music videos directed by Andy Morahan
Number-one singles in Australia
Number-one singles in New Zealand
Song recordings produced by Danny Kortchmar
Songs written by Billy Joel
Songs involved in plagiarism controversies
Songs about rivers